Straw Man is a 1951 mystery thriller novel by the American writer Doris Miles Disney.

Adaptation
It served as the basis for the 1953 British film The Straw Man starring Dermot Walsh and Lana Morris.

References

Bibliography
 Goble, Alan. The Complete Index to Literary Sources in Film. Walter de Gruyter, 1999.

1951 American novels
Novels by Doris Miles Disney
American thriller novels
American novels adapted into films